Dunkerton Colliery Halt railway station served the colliery near the village of Dunkerton, Somerset, England from 1911 to 1925 on the Bristol and North Somerset Railway.

History 
The station opened on 9 October 1911 by the Great Western Railway, around a year after the line and the main stations had opened. It was, from the outset, a basic unmanned halt, and was intended to serve the villages of Tunley and Carlingcott as well as workers at the colliery itself. The station first closed to passengers on 22 March 1915, reopened on 9 July 1923 and closed again on 21 September 1925 to both passengers and goods traffic.

References

External links 

Disused railway stations in Somerset
Former Great Western Railway stations
Railway stations in Great Britain opened in 1911
Railway stations in Great Britain closed in 1915
Railway stations in Great Britain opened in 1923
Railway stations in Great Britain closed in 1925
1910 establishments in England
1925 disestablishments in England